Oochoristica leonregagnonae is a species of cestodes found in the iguana Ctenosaura pectinata.

Description
It has a large number of testes (78–112), and numerous ovarian lobes (31–79). Its testes are limited to the central region between the excretory canals.

References

Cestoda
Parasites of lizards